The 2016 Judo Grand Prix Almaty was held at the Sport Palace Baluan Sholak in Almaty, Kazakhstan from 13 to 15 May 2016.

Medal summary

Men's events

Women's events

Source Results

Medal table

References

External links
 

2016 IJF World Tour
2016 Judo Grand Prix
Judo
Grand 2016
Judo
May 2016 sports events in Asia